Marlin is a digital and print magazine that covers big game fishing around the world. Its headquarters are in Winter Park, Florida, and is published by the Bonnier Corporation.

Sam White is Editor-in-Chief of the magazine. Marlin contains updates on the world's hottest billfishing destinations, insider tips on live-baiting and trolling, glimpses of people influencing the sport and reviews on the latest equipment.

References

External links
 Official website

1981 establishments in Florida
Bonnier Group
Eight times annually magazines published in the United States
Hunting and fishing magazines
Magazines established in 1981
Magazines published in Florida
Recreational fishing
Sport fish
Sports magazines published in the United States